Edward Glines (1849–1917) was a Massachusetts politician who served as the eleventh Mayor of Somerville, Massachusetts.

Glines was a delegate to the 1892 Republican National Convention.  Glines was chosen as a Presidential elector in 1892 and he voted for Benjamin Harrison and Whitelaw Reid in the Electoral College.

See also
 109th Massachusetts General Court (1888)

Notes

1849 births
1917 deaths
Republican Party members of the Massachusetts House of Representatives
Republican Party Massachusetts state senators
Mayors of Somerville, Massachusetts
Massachusetts city council members
1892 United States presidential electors